The Château de Montfort is a castle in the French commune of Montigny-Montfort in the Côte-d'Or département, part of the Burgundy region. The castle was built in the 18th century.  

It is well known for St. John's Fire (Feu de Saint-Jean) on St. John's Eve, as part of Medieval Festival of Château Montfort (Fête Médiévale au Château de Montfort), held in the castle every year around June 21–24.

See also
 List of castles in France
 St. John's Day

References

 
Castles in Bourgogne-Franche-Comté